Noble Andrew Hull (March 11, 1827 – January 28, 1907) was a U.S. Representative from Florida and the sixth Lieutenant Governor of Florida.

Early life

Born in Little York, Georgia, and raised on a plantation, Hull attended the county schools and Chatham Academy in Savannah, Georgia. He engaged in mercantile pursuits in Savannah in 1845. In 1851, he moved to Florida and continued his business in Columbia County. When Suwannee County was formed out of part of Columbia County in 1858, was elected the new county's first sheriff.

The Civil War
Hull represented Columbia County in the Florida House of Representatives in 1860 and 1861 and was present at the convention in which Florida seceded from the Union. During the Civil War, he served as captain of Company H, First Florida Cavalry, in the Confederate States Army. After the war, he settled in Jacksonville, where his home remained except for a three-year period he spent in Sanford.

Lieutenant Governor and Congressman
Hull was sworn in as Florida's sixth lieutenant governor along with Governor George F. Drew on January 2, 1877. He was elected to the U.S. House of Representatives in 1878, and the following year, he resigned as Lieutenant Governor. Hull took his seat in the 46th Congress on March 4, 1879. However, his opponent, Horatio Bisbee, Jr., contested the election and succeeded him on January 22, 1881.

Later life
After his term in Congress, Hull served as assistant postmaster of Jacksonville from 1884 to 1888 and clerk of Duval County circuit court from 1888 to 1900.

Hull married Eleanor C. Sturdivant on January 24, 1860. They had one daughter before his wife died on January 27, 1902. Hull died in Jacksonville on January 28, 1907, and was interred in Evergreen Cemetery.

References

People from Suwannee County, Florida
1827 births
1907 deaths
Democratic Party members of the United States House of Representatives from Florida
Confederate States Army officers
Lieutenant Governors of Florida
Democratic Party members of the Florida House of Representatives
19th-century American politicians